Guseong Station is a subway station of the Bundang Line, the commuter subway line of Korail, the national railway of South Korea. The GTX A station (named Yongin Station) is under construction right next to this station, and will be connected to each other.

The station was opened in December 2011 as part of the latest southward extension of the Bundang Line. Near this station, there is E-mart traders, Guseong middle school, and Guseong high school.

Seoul Metropolitan Subway stations
Metro stations in Yongin
Railway stations opened in 2011